Nogometni klub Ivančna Gorica, commonly referred to as NK Ivančna Gorica or simply Ivančna Gorica, is a Slovenian football club which plays in the town of Ivančna Gorica. They play in the Ljubljana Regional League, the fourth highest league in Slovenia. The club was founded in 1973.

Between 1984 and 2011, the club was known as Livar due to the sponsorship of local foundry company Imp Livar.

Honours
Slovenian Second League
Winners: 2006–07

Slovenian Third League
Winners: 1998–99

Slovenian Fourth Division
Winners: 1997–98

MNZ Ljubljana Cup
Winners: 1997–98, 1998–99, 2004–05, 2014–15

References

External links
Official website 

Association football clubs established in 1973
Football clubs in Slovenia
Football clubs in Yugoslavia
1973 establishments in Slovenia